The 1912 United States presidential election in Minnesota took place on November 5, 1912 as part of the 1912 United States presidential election. Minnesota voters chose 12 electors to the Electoral College, which selected the president and vice president.

Minnesota was won by the Progressive candidate, former President Theodore Roosevelt, won the state over the Democratic candidate, New Jersey governor Woodrow Wilson, by a margin of 19,430 votes, or 5.82%, while Republican incumbent President William Howard Taft came in third, with just 19.25% of the vote, and perennial Socialist candidate Eugene V. Debs came in fourth while winning the votes of 8.23% of Minnesota voters. Nationally, Wilson won the election, with 435 electoral votes and a landslide 14.44% lead over Roosevelt in the popular vote, while Taft finished third, with 23.17% of the vote, and Debs won a personal record 5.99% of the national popular vote.

Nationally, the 1912 election was the first United States presidential election since 1860 in which there were four candidates who each won more than five percent of the popular vote, and the first since 1852 in which the ticket of a party other than the Democratic and Republican parties finished second (as well as the last). It was the only presidential election in American history in which an incumbent President faced both his immediate predecessor and his immediate successor in the general election. As a result of the 1912 election, Woodrow Wilson became the second of only two Democrats elected president between 1860 and 1932. It was also the first presidential election in which all 48 of the contiguous United States participated.

The 1912 election was the first presidential election held since statehood in which the Republican ticket lost in Minnesota, and the only presidential election in which a party other than the Democratic and Republican parties won Minnesota's electoral votes. It was the only presidential election since statehood in which the Republican ticket failed to carry a single county in Minnesota, and the only presidential election in which the Republican ticket finished less than second in the state. Taft's 19.25% still ranks as the lowest percentage of the popular vote any Republican presidential nominee has ever won in Minnesota.

The 1912 election also marked the high water point for the Socialist Party of America, both nationally and in Minnesota. No Socialist Party candidate—before or since—has ever won a higher percentage of the national popular vote than Debs did in 1912, and no Socialist Party candidate for any office has won a higher percentage of the statewide vote in Minnesota. In Minnesota, Debs carried two counties (Beltrami and Lake); nationally, he carried two more (Crawford County, Kansas and Burke County, North Dakota).

Minnesota would not go against the Republican Party in a presidential election again until Democrat Franklin D. Roosevelt won the state in 1932.

With 37.66% of the popular vote, Minnesota would prove to be Roosevelt's fourth-strongest state in terms of popular vote percentage in the 1912 election after South Dakota, California and Michigan.

Results

See also
 United States presidential elections in Minnesota

References

1912
Min
1912 Minnesota elections